Bartholomew County Courthouse is a historic courthouse located at Columbus, Bartholomew County, Indiana.  It was designed by noted Indiana architect Isaac Hodgson, built in 1871–1874 at the cost of $250,000, and dedicated in 1874. Construction was by McCormack and Sweeny. The building was hailed as "the finest in the West" upon its completion.

It is a three-story, Second Empire-style red-brick building trimmed in limestone.  It features a mansard roof, corner pavilions, Corinthian-order portico, and a six-level clock tower. The clock tower is 154 feet tall. A six-inch thick, 10-ten clock bell was installed in 1875.  The clock's weighted mechanism were replaced with an electric motor in 1940 and a 900-pound weight fell.

It was added to the National Register of Historic Places on November 15, 1979.  It is located in the Columbus Historic District.

References

Clock towers in Indiana
County courthouses in Indiana
Courthouses on the National Register of Historic Places in Indiana
Second Empire architecture in Indiana
Government buildings completed in 1874
Buildings and structures in Bartholomew County, Indiana
National Register of Historic Places in Bartholomew County, Indiana
1874 establishments in Indiana
Individually listed contributing properties to historic districts on the National Register in Indiana
Buildings with mansard roofs